Blood Will Tell is a 2004 video game.

Blood Will Tell may also refer to:

Blood Will Tell, a 1917 film directed by Charles Miller
Blood Will Tell, a 1949 Hong Kong film directed by Yueh Feng
Blood Will Tell (1927 film), an American silent Western film
Blood Will Tell (2019 film), an Argentinian thriller
"Blood Will Tell" (short story), a 1963 Rex Stout short story
Blood Will Tell, alternate title for the 1952 Agatha Christie novel Mrs McGinty's Dead
 Blood Will Tell: The Murder Trials of T. Cullen Davis, a 1979 book by Gary Cartwright